Joseph Michailidis (born 15 October 1947) is a Czech former footballer who played as a midfielder.

Career  
Michailidis played in the Czechoslovak First League with Spartak ZJŠ Brno in 1966. The following season he played with FK Jablonec. In late 1969, he played in the Alpha Ethniki with Aris Thessaloniki F.C. In his debut season with Thessaloniki he assisted in securing the 1969–70 Greek Football Cup. In the summer of 1974 he played in the National Soccer League with Toronto Homer.

Managerial career 
Michailidis served as a head coach for Olympiakos Chicago in the United States.

References  
 

Living people
1947 births
Association football midfielders
Czech footballers
FC Zbrojovka Brno players
FK Jablonec players
Aris Thessaloniki F.C. players
Czechoslovak First League players
Super League Greece players
Canadian National Soccer League players
Czech football managers
Czech people of Greek descent